Bhogaraju Ramana Rao  is an Indian physician and cardiologist from Bangalore. He was born in Hyderabad. His parents belonged to West Godavari District of Andhra Pradesh. Rao has been offering health care to rural people free of cost for the last 36 years. He was awarded the Padma Shri in 2010 for his contribution to the field of medicine.  Rao was Kannada thespian Dr.Rajkumar’s consulting physician. Rao married to Smt Hema a Delhi based on 25 Dec 1975. He also contributed toilet and drinking water in rural areas of 16 villages.

References

Living people
Recipients of the Padma Shri in medicine
20th-century Indian medical doctors
Year of birth missing (living people)
Medical doctors from Bangalore